"Grace" is a song by Britpop band Supergrass. It was the second single to be taken from Life on Other Planets (2002), the band's fourth studio album. It was released on 16 September 2002 and reached number 13 on the UK Singles Chart. Unlike the previous single, "Never Done Nothing Like That Before", a vinyl-only release, it was released on all major formats.

Background
Gaz Coombes explained the meaning of the song:

"This one came from the daughter of Chris Difford. Part of the record was done in the small studio right behind his home. While recording, we often got visited by his daughters. No, not that kind! They're really sweet children. Kids in the studio just add to the right atmosphere. You can do great jams with them. That's how 'Grace' developed.

One of these girls always carried a small money box around. Save The Money For The Children, it says. One day, Danny came in drunk, and started rambling on a piano, shouting all kinds of weird lyrics. So, we used the line from the money box, and thought: that will do for the B Side. But once we started recording it for real, it became better and better, and it's even our new single now!. Yeah, things can go truly odd."

Music video
The video for "Grace" was directed by Dom and Nic, and shows Supergrass performing the song, in a rundown rehearsal room, whilst a ten-year-old girl spies through the window, and tries to produce the group, as they play. The idea was to create a "surreal spiritualist video."

Track listings
UK CD1 (CDRS 6586)
 "Grace"
 "Velvetine"
 "Electric Cowboy"
 "Grace" (video)

UK CD2 (CDR 6586)
 "Grace"
 "Tishing in Windows (Kicking Down Doors)"
 "That Old Song"

UK limited edition pink 7-inch single (R 6586)
A. "Grace"
B. "Velvetine"

Charts

References

2001 songs
2002 singles
Parlophone singles
Songs written by Rob Coombes
Supergrass songs